A Soul Astray is a 1914 American silent short drama film directed by Tom Ricketts. The film stars Charlotte Burton, William Bertram, Edith Borella, Ed Coxen, Reaves Eason, George Field and Winifred Greenwood.

References

External links

1914 films
1914 drama films
Silent American drama films
American silent short films
American black-and-white films
1914 short films
Films directed by Tom Ricketts
1910s American films